Sailboarding, also known as Windsurfing for the 2013 Island Games, will take place at the Spanish Point Boat Club in Pembroke Parish. The schedule states that medals will be awarded on 19 July 2013. However, depending on the weather, preliminary races could occur from 13 to 18 July 2013.

Medal table
 Bermuda 2013 Sailboarding Medal Tally

Medal summary

References

2013 in sailing
2013 Island Games
2013
Sailing competitions in Bermuda